Australasian refers to Australasia, a region that comprises Australia, New Zealand and some neighbouring islands in the Pacific Ocean. 

Australasian may also refer to:

Ships
 SS Australasian, a 19th-century steamship liner owned by Cunard Line
 SS Australasian, the name of two steamships owned by Allan Line Royal Mail Steamers
 SS Australasian (1884), later SS Scham

See also
 
 Austroasiatic languages
 Austronesian languages